The Sanshikan, or Council of Three, was a government body of the Ryūkyū Kingdom, which originally developed out of a council of regents.

It emerged in 1556, when the young Shō Gen, who was mute, ascended to the throne of Ryūkyū. The council of regents that formed in order to handle this challenge and manage the country on the king's behalf soon grew into an established and powerful government organ. Shō Gen died in 1571, but the Council remained, acting alongside the successive kings in managing the affairs of government. In fact, the Articles Subscribed to by the King's Councillors, which bound the royal government in loyalty and servitude to the Japanese daimyō of Satsuma, explicitly prohibit the king from "entrust[ing] the conduct of public affairs in the islands to any persons other than San-shi-kuan".

Over time, the Sanshikan eclipsed the power and prestige of the sessei, a post which is often translated as "prime minister," and which served as chief royal advisor. Candidates to join the Council of Three had to live in Shuri, the capital, and had to pass tests of both merit and birth; they had to be of proper aristocratic heritage, and to pass tests of knowledge of literature, ethics, and other classical Chinese subjects. These exams were very much akin to those taken by scholar-bureaucrats in China, but were less strict.

The Council, and sessei, worked alongside the heads of various administrative departments who were known as the Council of Fifteen when assembled. The Fifteen advised the higher-ranking officials on policy, and made recommendations to fill vacancies in the administration.

The Sanshikan was dismantled along with the rest of the royal government when Ryūkyū was formally annexed by Meiji Japan in the 1870s. Members of Ryūkyū's aristocratic class were allowed to maintain some of their prestige and privileges, but even members of the Council were only afforded the equivalent of the sixth rank in the Japanese Imperial Court structure.

List of Sanshikan

Uncategorized

Chūkaban

Shikaban

Yūkaban

Notes

References
Kerr, George H. (2000). Okinawa: the History of an Island People. (revised ed.) Boston: Tuttle Publishing. 
Smits, Gregory (1999). "Visions of Ryukyu: Identity and Ideology in Early-Modern Thought and Politics." Honolulu: University of Hawai'i Press.

External links
中山王府相卿伝職年譜　向祐等著写本

 
1556 establishments in Asia